John Deane was an administrator of the English East India Company. He served as President of Bengal in the early eighteenth century.

For over twenty years, he lived with an Indian mistress, Mussumaut Matloob Brish, with whom he had six children.

References

Presidents of Bengal
English businesspeople
British East India Company people
18th-century British people
Year of birth missing
Year of death missing
British governors of Bengal